Francesco Lorenzi (Mazzurega near Verona, 1723 - February 12, 1787) was an Italian painter of the late Baroque period.

Biography
He was initially a pupil of Matteo Brida in Verona, but went to Venice and became a pupil of Giovanni Battista Tiepolo.

In Venice, he painted an altarpiece for a chapel in Santa Caterina (Venice). In 1750, he returns to Verona, where he obtained many commissions, although he had to compete with his contemporary Giambettino Cignaroli. Many of his works were in fresco. He even set up an academy that competed with Cignaroli, the Accademia Aletofili. He painted a Holy Family for the church of San Lorenzo in Brescia. He was active across the region. Boni quotes two death dates, either 1783 or 1788. He painted the figures while Filippo Maccari painted the quadratura for a room in the casa Ferrari in the San Silvestro. Lorenzi painted a chiaroscuro bust of Maccari himself. Francesco's brother, Giovanni Domenico Lorenzi, was an engraver.

References

External links
Giambattista Tiepolo, 1696-1770, a full text exhibition catalog from The Metropolitan Museum of Art

18th-century Italian painters
Italian male painters
Painters from Verona
Italian Baroque painters
1723 births
1787 deaths
18th-century Italian male artists